The Lady's Pictorial Tournament was a women's golf tournament contested annually from 1911 to 1914. It was held at Stoke Poges Golf Club near Slough, England. There were a number of qualifying stroke play events with a total of 16 players advancing to the final match play stage. In 1911 it was called the Lady's Pictorial Coronation Cup, being played near the time of the Coronation of George V and Mary. In addition to the main scratch event there were also two handicap sections, which were played using a similar format.

In 1911 there were 8 qualifying sections with two players qualifying at each. There were three sections for England, two for Ireland and Scotland and one for Wales. In 1912 there was only one section for Ireland with England having four sections. The qualifying format was revised in 1913 with the number of qualifying events for the scratch event being reduced to two. One, for England, Ireland and Wales, was held at Worplesdon Golf Club in late April with 10 players qualifying. The Scottish qualifying, with 6 places available, was held at Machrihanish Golf Club in June, the day before the start of the Scottish Women's Amateur Championship. Qualifying for the handicap sections remained unchanged with 8 regional events. The 1914 qualifying followed a similar form to that used in 1913, although 12 qualifying places were allocated to England, Ireland and Wales and only 4 for Scotland. Qualifying took place at Woking Golf Club and Muirfield.

Winners

References

Amateur golf tournaments
Women's golf tournaments
Golf tournaments in England
Recurring sporting events established in 1911
Recurring sporting events disestablished in 1914
1911 establishments in England
1914 disestablishments in England